Artistang Artlets, (official name during establishment: The Arts and Letters Theater Guild; now colloquially known with the abbreviation AA),  is a Filipino theatre company founded by Marie Luz Datu and Nicolas Galvez, Jr. at the University of Santo Tomas. It was subsequently recognized as the official theatre guild of the UST Faculty of Arts and Letters.

AA is composed of writers, composers, actors, musicians, choreographers, and other theatrical production staff from the UST Faculty of Arts and Letters, constantly partnering with Teatro Tomasino and the Philippine Educational Theater Association for several productions.

Select productions

Select alumni
Winnie Cordero
Faye Martel
Keavy Vicente
Isay Alvarez

References

External links 
 

Musical theatre companies
Theatre companies in the Philippines
Organizations established in 1980
Theater companies in Metro Manila
Cultural organizations based in the Philippines
Theatre in the Philippines